Rhett Davies (born 1949 in London) is an English record producer and engineer.

Davies' father was trumpet player Ray Davies (no relation to Ray Davies of The Kinks). Davies became a studio engineer at Island Records studios in the early 1970s, and his first session was the recording for Brian Eno's album Taking Tiger Mountain (By Strategy) (1974). Davies and Eno worked together on several further projects and made innovations in studio recording techniques, especially regarding tape loops and drum machines. He produced many artists of the 1970s and 1980s, but largely retired from production work in the 1990s although he continued to work with Bryan Ferry, for example on Dylanesque (2007), Olympia (co-producer, 2010) and Avonmore (2014).

Credits
Davies produced and/or engineered the following albums:

Genesis - Selling England by the Pound
Bryan Ferry - Another Time, Another Place, Boys and Girls, Dylanesque, Olympia, The Jazz Age, Avonmore
Roxy Music - Viva!, Manifesto, Flesh and Blood, Avalon, High Road
Trapeze - Hot Wire
Robert Palmer - Sneakin' Sally Through the Alley, Maybe It's Live
Brian Eno - Taking Tiger Mountain, Another Green World, Evening Star, Before and After Science, Ambient 1: Music for Airports, Music for Films
Jim Capaldi - Whale Meat Again
Phil Manzanera - Diamond Head, 801 Live, Listen Now, Primitive Guitars
Camel - Snow Goose, Moonmadness, Rain Dances, A Live Record
The Hollies - Russian Roulette, Crazy Steal
Russ Ballard - Winning
Dire Straits - Dire Straits
Talking Heads - More Songs About Buildings and Food
King Crimson - Discipline, Beat
The B-52's - Wild Planet, Party Mix!
Split Enz - Second Thoughts, Enz of an Era
Orchestral Manoeuvres in the Dark - Dazzle Ships
Icehouse - Measure for Measure
Cock Robin - First Love Last Rites
Til Tuesday - Welcome Home
Wang Chung - Huang Chung
Then Jerico - The Big Area

References
[ Rhett Davies @ Allmusic.com]

1949 births
Living people
Musicians from London
English record producers